The National Housing Act (NHA)(the Act) was passed by the Parliament of Canada in 1938 and was intended to promote the construction of new houses, the repair and modernization of existing houses, and the improvement of housing and living conditions. It replaced and expanded the scope of the Dominion Housing Act of 1935.

The purpose of the NHA set out in section 3 "in relation to financing for housing, is to promote housing affordability and choice, to facilitate access to, and competition and efficiency in the provision of, housing finance, to protect the availability of adequate funding for housing at low cost, and generally to contribute to the well-being of the housing sector in the national economy."

In 1945, the Central Mortgage and Housing Corporation (later renamed Canada Mortgage and Housing Corporation) was created to administer the NHA.

Replacement National Housing Acts were passed in 1944 and 1954. Major amendments to these acts occurred in 1948, 1949, 1956, 1964, 1969, 1973, 1985, 1999 and 2007.

The 1948 amendments introduced limited-dividend housing. In 1949, the Act was again amended to include funding for public, rent-geared-to-income housing, however, this was seen as a "tokenist" gesture and very few social housing units were built. The NHA of 1954 was largely the same as the two previous NHAs in its objective to "maintain the private mortgage market," however did it replace the joint-loan program with a mortgage-loan one.

The 1964 amendments made provinces, municipalities or their agencies the sole owners of public housing, as previously public housing was jointly owned with CMHC.

The 1973 amendments shifted the federal approach to low-income housing from "social," segregated public housing to "comprehensive" housing policy and included provisions for non-profit and co-operative housing.

The Dominion Housing Act and the National Housing Acts of 1938 and 1944 were drafted by Deputy Minister of Finance William Clifford Clark.

Dominion Housing Act 1935

The Dominion Housing Act 1935, Canada's first national housing policy, was included as part of "Canada's New Deal" put forward by Prime Minister R. B. Bennett. Bennett was facing an election with low support following his government's response to the Great Depression and taking inspiration from President Roosevelt's New Deal, Bennett proposed regulatory and social safety net legislation. Despite demands for affordable housing from social reformers, the DHA ended up setting the tone for all future housing legislation with the provision of loans for the wealthiest Canadians and promotion of homeownership and mortgage lending infrastructure. A total of 3,263 mortgage loans were administered through the Dominion Housing Act from 1935 to 1938.

The DHA consisted of two parts:
1) a proposal for the continued study of the housing problem by the (also proposed) Economic Council of Canada;
2) a plan for the federal state to combine with lenders in the provision of joint mortgage loans to buyers and builders of new homes.

References

Notes

External links
 National Housing Act R.S.C., 1985, c. N-11

1938 in Canadian law
Canadian federal legislation
Housing legislation in Canada
Public housing in Canada
Property law of Canada